The Sutong Yangtze Bridge is a cable-stayed bridge that spans the Yangtze in China between Nantong and Changshu, a satellite city of Suzhou, in Jiangsu province.

Design and construction
The Sutong Yangtze River Bridge was designed by Dr. Robin Sham, CBE, FICE, a Hong Kong-born and British-based structural engineer who specializes in bridges. Its two side spans are  each, and there are also four small cable spans. The bridge received the 2010 Outstanding Civil Engineering Achievement award (OCEA) from the American Society of Civil Engineers.

Construction began in June 2003, and the bridge was linked up in June 2007. The bridge was opened to traffic on 25 May 2008 and was officially opened on 30 June 2008. Construction has been estimated to cost about US$1.7 billion.

The completion of the bridge shortens the commute between Shanghai and Nantong, previously a four-hour ferry ride, to about an hour. 
It brings Nantong one step closer to becoming an important part of the Yangtze Delta economic zone, and has further attracted foreign investors into the city. The bridge is also pivotal in the development of poorer northern Jiangsu regions.

The tower is an inverted Y-shaped reinforced concrete structure with one connecting girder between tower legs. The bridge deck is a steel box girder with internal transverse and longitudinal diaphragms and fairing noses at both sides of the bridge deck. The total width of the bridge deck is 41 metres including the fairing noses.

The construction of Zhaodian-Huangdu Section of Nantong-Shanghai Railway was commenced in March 2014. Following the completion of subgrade, bridges, mainline track-laying, and “communication, signal, power and electrification” works, the integrated commissioning & test began on 20 April 2020

Gallery

See also
 List of bridges in China
 Yangtze River bridges and tunnels
 List of tallest bridges in the world

References

External links

AECOM Transportation
Official website  Retrieved 2009-12-11.
Roadtraffic Technology
China.org
virtualreview.org

Road bridges in China
Bridges over the Yangtze River
Cable-stayed bridges in China
Bridges completed in 2008
Bridges in Jiangsu
Bridges in Suzhou